Torino Hunte (born 14 December 1990) is a Dutch professional footballer who plays as a winger. He formerly played for FC Eindhoven, Almere City, VVV-Venlo and FC Den Bosch.

Club career
On 31 January 2022, Hunte signed with FC Den Bosch until the end of the season.

On 27 June 2022, he signed with Politehnica Iași in Romania.

Personal life
Born in the Netherlands, Hunte is of Surinamese descent.

References

External links
 

Living people
1990 births
People from Goirle
Association football wingers
Dutch footballers
Dutch sportspeople of Surinamese descent
FC Eindhoven players
VVV-Venlo players
Almere City FC players
FC Den Bosch players
Liga II players
FC Politehnica Iași (2010) players
Eredivisie players
Eerste Divisie players
Footballers from North Brabant
Dutch expatriate footballers
Expatriate footballers in Romania
Dutch expatriate sportspeople in Romania